The Billerica Town Common District is a historic district encompassing what remains of the 1655 town common of Billerica, Massachusetts, and the properties surrounding it.  The district is roughly bounded by Cummings Street, Concord Road, and Boston Road.  It includes the site of the town's first meeting house, and a variety of predominantly 19th-century structures, including two churches and the town hall.

The common was originally set aside for Captain Daniel Gookin in 1655, but reverted to the community when he did not claim it.  The first meeting house was built in 1663, and part of the land was set aside as a militia training ground in 1694.  It was used as a muster point for the local militia when the American Revolutionary War broke out in 1775.

The district was listed on the National Register of Historic Places in 1973.

See also
National Register of Historic Places listings in Middlesex County, Massachusetts

References

Historic districts in Middlesex County, Massachusetts
Buildings and structures in Billerica, Massachusetts
National Register of Historic Places in Middlesex County, Massachusetts
Historic districts on the National Register of Historic Places in Massachusetts